Giuseppe Sicurella (born 28 May 1994) is an Italian football player. He plays for Arezzo.

Club career
He made his Serie C debut for Foggia on 12 September 2014 in a game against Melfi.

He returned from his loan at Pro Piacenza to Foggia in January 2019 as Pro Piacenza experienced financial difficulties.

On 17 July 2019 he signed with Sicula Leonzio.

On 25 September 2020 he joined Grosseto.

On 27 August 2021 he joined Serie D club Arezzo.

References

External links
 

1994 births
People from Mazara del Vallo
Footballers from Sicily
Living people
Italian footballers
Association football midfielders
Casale F.B.C. players
Calcio Foggia 1920 players
F.C. Lumezzane V.G.Z. A.S.D. players
Virtus Francavilla Calcio players
A.S. Pro Piacenza 1919 players
A.S.D. Sicula Leonzio players
U.S. Grosseto 1912 players
S.S. Arezzo players
Serie C players
Serie D players
Sportspeople from the Province of Trapani